Milan Minić is the name of:
 Milan Minić (basketball) (born 1954), Serbian basketball coach
 Milan Minić (architect) (1899–1961), Serbian architect and painter